Dayana Chirinos (born 1991) is a Venezuelan weightlifter. She has won medals in weightlifting at the Bolivarian Games, Central American and Caribbean Games, South American Games and Pan American Weightlifting Championships.

She won the silver medal in the women's 75kg event at the 2017 Pan American Weightlifting Championships held in Miami, United States. In 2021, she won the bronze medal in the women's 87kg event at the 2020 Pan American Weightlifting Championships held in Santo Domingo, Dominican Republic. She finished in 4th place in the women's 81kg event at the 2021 World Weightlifting Championships held in Tashkent, Uzbekistan.

She won the bronze medal in her event at the 2022 South American Games held in Asunción, Paraguay.

References

External links 
 

Living people
1991 births
Place of birth missing (living people)
Venezuelan female weightlifters
Pan American Weightlifting Championships medalists
Central American and Caribbean Games medalists in weightlifting
Central American and Caribbean Games bronze medalists for Venezuela
Competitors at the 2018 Central American and Caribbean Games
South American Games bronze medalists for Venezuela
South American Games medalists in weightlifting
Competitors at the 2018 South American Games
Competitors at the 2022 South American Games
21st-century Venezuelan women